Fernando Redondo (born March 16, 1978) is an Argentine sprint canoer who competed in the early 2000s. At the 2000 Summer Olympics in Sydney, he was eliminated in the heats of the K-2 1000 m event.

References
Sports-Reference.com profile

1978 births
Argentine male canoeists
Canoeists at the 2000 Summer Olympics
Living people
Olympic canoeists of Argentina
Pan American Games medalists in canoeing
Pan American Games silver medalists for Argentina
Pan American Games bronze medalists for Argentina
Canoeists at the 2003 Pan American Games
Medalists at the 2003 Pan American Games